The historical immigration to Great Britain concerns the movement of people, cultural and ethnic groups to the British Isles before Irish independence in 1922. Immigration after Irish independence is dealt with by the article Immigration to the United Kingdom since Irish independence.

Modern humans first arrived in Great Britain during the Palaeolithic era, but until the invasion of the Romans (1st century BC) there was no historical record. With the Fall of the Western Roman Empire, large numbers of Germanic speakers from the continent migrated to the southern parts of the island, becoming known as the Anglo-Saxons and eventually forming England. Beginning at the end of the eighth century, bands of Vikings began to invade and subsequently settle. In 1066, the Normans successfully took control of England and, in subsequent years, there was some small-scale migration from France. Other European migrants included Flemings and French Huguenots. In the 19th century, immigration by people outside Europe began with arrivals from the British colonies. The overall foreign born population of Britain being 0.6% in 1851, 1.5% in 1901, many coming from Eastern Europe and Russia.

DNA studies have been used to provide a direct record of the effects of immigration on the population.

Antiquity

Roman Empire

The first Roman invasion of Great Britain was led by Julius Caesar in 55 BC; the second, a year later in 54 BC.  The Romans had many supporters among the Celtic tribal leaders, who agreed to pay tribute to Rome in return for Roman protection.  The Romans returned in AD 43, led by the Emperor Claudius, this time establishing control, and establishing the province of Britannia.  Initially an oppressive rule, gradually the new leaders gained a firmer hold on their new territory which at one point stretched from the south coast of England to Wales and northwards as far as southern Scotland.

During the 367 years of Roman occupation of Britain, many settlers were soldiers garrisoned on the mainland.  It was with constant contact with Rome and the rest of Romanised Europe through trade and industry that the elite native Britons themselves adopted Roman culture and customs, such as the Latin language, though the majority in the countryside were little affected.

The capital city of Londonium was an ethnically diverse city with inhabitants from across the Roman Empire, including natives of Britannia, continental Europe, the Middle East, and North Africa. There was also cultural diversity in other Roman-British towns, which were sustained by considerable migration, both within Britannia and from other Roman territories, including North Africa, Roman Syria, the Eastern Mediterranean, and continental Europe. Of Roman Britain's estimated population of three million, the urban population was about 240,000 people, with Londinium having an estimated 60,000 people. However, after Britannia ceased to be a functional Roman province, many of the urban areas collapsed and the overall population may have declined by as much as two million.

Irish (medieval)

During the 5th century, Irish pirates known as the Scotti started raiding north-western Britain from their base in north-east Ireland. After the Roman withdrawal they established the kingdom of Dál Riata, roughly equivalent to Argyll. This migration is traditionally held to be the means by which Primitive Irish was introduced into what is now Scotland. However, it has been posited that the language may already have been spoken in this region for centuries, having developed as part of a larger Goidelic language zone, and that there was little Irish settlement in this period. Similar proposals have been made for areas of western Wales, where an Irish language presence is evident. Others have argued that the traditional narrative of significant migration, particularly in the case of Dál Riata, is likely correct.

Anglo-Saxons

Germanic (Frankish) mercenaries were employed in Gaul by the Roman Empire and it is speculated that in a similar manner, the first Germanic immigrants to Britain arrived at the invitation of the British ruling classes at the end of the Roman period. Though the (probably mythical) landing of Hengist and Horsa in Kent in 449 is traditionally considered to be the start of the Anglo-Saxon migrations, archaeological evidence has shown that significant settlement in East Anglia predated this by nearly half a century.

The key area of large-scale migration was southeastern Britain; in this region, place names of Celtic and Latin origin are extremely few. Genetic and isotope evidence has demonstrated that the settlers included both men and women, many of whom were of a low socioeconomic status, and that migration continued over an extended period, possibly more than two hundred years. The varied dialects spoken by the new arrivals eventually coalesced into Old English, the ancestor of the modern English language.

In the Post-Roman period the traditional division of the Anglo-Saxons into Angles, Saxons and Jutes is first seen in the Historia ecclesiastica gentis Anglorum by Bede; however, historical and archaeological research has shown that a wider range of Germanic peoples from Frisia, Lower Saxony, Jutland and possibly southern Sweden moved to Britain during this period. Scholars have stressed that the adoption of specifically Anglian, Saxon and Jutish identities was the result of a later period of ethnogenesis.

Following the settlement period, Anglo-Saxon elites and kingdoms began to emerge; these are traditionally grouped together as the Heptarchy. Their formation has been linked to a second stage of Anglo-Saxon expansion in which the kingdoms of Wessex, Mercia and Northumbria each began periods of conquest of British territory. It is likely that these kingdoms housed significant numbers of Britons, particularly on their western margins. That this was the case is demonstrated by the late seventh century laws of King Ine, which made specific provisions for Britons who lived in Wessex.

Medieval

Vikings

The earliest date given for a Viking raid of Britain is 789 when, according to the Anglo-Saxon Chronicle, Portland was attacked.  A more exact report dates from 8 June 793, when the cloister at Lindisfarne was pillaged by foreign seafarers. These raiders, whose expeditions extended well into the 9th century, were gradually followed by armies and settlers who brought a new culture and tradition markedly different from that of the prevalent Anglo-Saxon society of southern Britain. The Danelaw, established through the Viking conquest of large parts of the Anglo-Saxon cultural sphere, was formed as a result of the Treaty of Wedmore in the late 9th century, after Alfred the Great had defeated the Viking Guthrum at the Battle of Ethandun. Between 1016 and 1042 England was ruled by Danish kings. Following this, the Anglo-Saxons regained control until 1066.

Though located formally within the Danelaw, counties such as Hertfordshire, Bedfordshire, and Essex do not seem to have experienced much Danish settlement, which was more concentrated in Yorkshire, Lincolnshire, Nottinghamshire and Leicestershire, as demonstrated by toponymic evidence. The Scandinavians who settled along the coast of the Irish sea were mainly of Norwegian origin, though many had arrived via Ireland.

Most of the Vikings arriving in the northern parts of Britain also originated in Norway. Settlement was densest in the Shetland and Orkney islands and Caithness, where Norn, a language descended from Old Norse, was historically spoken, but a Viking presence has also been identified in the Hebrides and the western Scottish Highlands.

Normans

The Norman conquest of 1066 is normally considered the last successful attempt in history by a foreign army to take control of the Kingdom of England by means of military occupation. From the Norman point of view, William the Conqueror was the legitimate heir to the realm (as explained in the Bayeux Tapestry), and the invasion was required to secure this against the usurpation of Harold Godwinson. William ejected the Anglo-Saxon ruling class, installing his followers in their place. Most of these were from Normandy, but a significant portion were of Breton origin. Artisans and merchants from France also settled in England to take advantage of economic opportunities in the wake of the conquest.

In the years following the invasion to 1204, when Normandy was lost to France, the new nobility maintained close ties with their homelands across the channel. This was in part secured by granting aristocrats lands in both domains, giving an incentive on all levels to maintain the union. The influx of Norman military and ecclesiastical aristocracy changed the nature of the ruling class in England, leading to the creation of an Anglo-Norman population. Some French nobles moved north to Scotland at the invitation of King David I, where they established many of the royal houses that would dominate Scottish politics in the coming centuries. These included the Balliols, the Bruces and the FitzAlans.

Though the Normans formed a powerful elite, they were vastly outnumbered by their English and Scottish subjects. It has been estimated that they made up only 2 percent of the population of England.

Flemings

The later middle ages saw substantial Flemish migration to England, Wales and Scotland. The term "Fleming" was used to refer to natives of the Low Countries overall rather than Flanders specifically.

The first wave of Flemings arrived in England following floods in their low-lying homelands during the reign of Henry I. Eventually, the migrants were planted in Pembrokeshire in Wales. According to the Brut y Tywysogyon, the native inhabitants were driven from the area, with the Flemish replacing them. This region, in which Flemish and English were spoken from an early date, came to be known as Little England beyond Wales.

Many of the early Flemish settlers in England were weavers, and established themselves in the larger English towns and cities. In Scotland, Flemish incomers contributed to the burgeoning wool trade in the southeastern part of the country.

Roma in Britain

Romani people originated in the Punjab region of North India as a nomadic people. They entered Europe between the 8th and 10th centuries C.E., arriving in Western Europe by the 15th century. They were called "Gypsies", because Europeans mistakenly believed that they came from Egypt. This minority is made up of distinct groups called "tribes" or "nations". Roma spoke dialects of their common language, the Romani language, which is based on Sanskrit (the classical language of India), and is similar to other Indo-Aryan languages.

Roma in Britain have been documented since the early 16th century. The Egyptians Act 1530 was a response to the arrival of Romani Gypsies, known as "Egyptians" at the time, in Britain in the 16th century. The first definite record of Roma in Scotland was in 1505, and in England in 1513 or 1514. They were initially travellers, largely working as hawkers, basket weavers, craftsmen, blacksmiths and other occupations, but also as hostlers, jockeys, horse dealers, and many other occupations that involve working with horses.

Early modern

Huguenots
The Huguenots, French Protestants facing persecution following the revocation of the Edict of Nantes, began to move to England in large numbers around 1670, after King Charles II offered them sanctuary. Most came from regions in western France such as Poitou, and in all some 40–50,000 arrived. Though many towns and cities in England served as destinations for the Huguenot migrants, the largest number settled in the Spitalfields area of London, and, being former silk-weavers, brought new energy to this industry in the area and raised silk to an important fashion item in Britain.

South Asians

People from the Indian subcontinent have settled in Great Britain since the East India Company (EIC) recruited lascars to replace vacancies in their crews on East Indiamen whilst on voyages in India. Many were then refused passage back, and were marooned in London. There were also some ayahs, domestic servants and nannies of wealthy British families, who accompanied their employers back to "Blighty" when their stay in Asia came to an end.

The number of seamen from the East Indies employed on English ships was felt so worrisome at that time that the English tried to restrict their numbers by the Navigation Act of 1660, which restricted the employment of overseas sailors to a quarter of the crew on returning East India Company ships. Baptism records in East Greenwich suggest that young Indians from the Malabar Coast were being recruited as servants at the end of the 17th century, and records of the EIC also suggest that Indo-Portuguese cooks from Goa were retained by captains from voyage to voyage. In 1797, thirteen were buried in the parish of St Nicholas at Deptford.By the mid-19th century, there were at least 40,000 Indian seamen, diplomats, scholars, soldiers, officials, tourists, businessmen and students in Great Britain. In 1855 more than 25,000 of these were lascar seamen working on British ships. Lascars were a transitory group who would lodge in British ports in between voyages. 

Beginning in the 17th century, the East India Company brought over thousands of South Asian scholars, lascars, and other workers (who were mostly Bengali and/or Muslim) to England, some of whom settled down and took local European wives, due to a lack of Asian women in the British Isles at the time. Due to the majority of early Asian immigrants being lascars, the earliest Asian communities were found in port towns. Naval cooks also came, many of them from the Sylhet Division of what is now Bangladesh. One of the most famous 18th-century Bengali immigrants to Britain was Sake Dean Mahomed, a captain of the East India Company. In 1810, he founded London's first Indian restaurant, the Hindoostane Coffee House. He is also claimed as the person who introduced shampoo and therapeutic massage to Britain. By the 1930s about 7 to 10 thousand Indians had settled permanently in Britain.

Modern

Irish (modern)

There has been continuous migration from Ireland to Britain since before the middle ages, but the number of arrivals increased significantly in the nineteenth century, due to the Great Famine and job opportunities offered by the Industrial Revolution. The Irish communities in west coast cities such as Liverpool and Glasgow were particularly significant.

Africans

Following the British defeat in the American War of Independence over 1,100 Black Loyalist troops who had fought on the losing side were transported to Britain, but they mostly ended up destitute on London's streets and were viewed as a social problem. The Committee for the Relief of the Black Poor was formed. They distributed relief and helped the men to go overseas, some to what remained of British North America. In 1786, the committee funded an expedition of 280 black men, forty black women and seventy white wives and girlfriends to Sierra Leone. The settlement failed and within two years all but sixty of the migrants had died.

Germans

Throughout the 19th century a small population of German immigrants built up in Britain, numbering 28,644 in 1861. London held around half of this population, and other small communities existed in Manchester, Bradford and elsewhere. The German immigrant community was the largest group until 1891, when it became second only to Russian Jews. There was a mixture of classes and religious groupings, and a flourishing culture built up, with the growth of middle and working class clubs. Waiters and clerks were two main occupations, and many who worked in these professions went on to become restaurant owners and businessmen, to a considerable extent. This community maintained its size until the First World War, when public anti-German feeling became very prominent and the Government enacted a policy of forced internment and repatriation. The community in 1911 had reached 53,324, but fell to just over 20,000 after the war.

Russian Jews
England has had small Jewish communities for many centuries, subject to occasional expulsions, but British Jews numbered fewer than 10,000 at the start of the 19th century. After 1881 Russian Jews suffered bitter persecutions, and British Jews led fund-raising to enable their Russian co-religionists to emigrate to the United States. However, out of some 2,000,000 who left Russia by 1914, around 120,000 settled permanently in Britain. One of the main concentrations was the same Spitalfields area where Huguenots had earlier congregated. Immigration was reduced by the Aliens Act 1905 and virtually curtailed by the 1914 Aliens Restriction Act. In addition to those Russian Jews who settled permanently in the UK an estimated 500,000 Eastern European Jews transmigrated through British ports between 1881 and 1924. Most were bound for the United States and others migrated to Canada, South Africa, Latin America and the Antipodes.

Estimated number of migrants between 1800 and 1945

Immigration since 1945

Genetic history

Genetic studies have been used to calculate the impact of various historical migrations on the population of the British Isles. The most recent work, carried out using data collected from ancient skeletons, has suggested that the migration events which most drastically influenced the genetic makeup of the current British population were the arrival of the Bell Beaker people around 2500 BC, and the influx of the Anglo-Saxons following the Roman withdrawal.

Studies of DNA suggest that the biological influence on Britain of immigration from the Norman conquests up till the 20th century was small; The native population's genetics was marked more by stability than change.

Y Chromosome analysis
From Genetic analysis section, Sub-Roman Britain

Modern genetic evidence, based on analysis of the Y chromosomes of men currently living in Britain, the Western Isles, Orkney, Shetland, Friesland, Denmark, North Germany, Ireland, Norway and the Basque Country, is consistent with the presence of some indigenous component in all British regions. For the sake of this study samples from the Basque Country were considered indigenous (a putative paleolithic Y chromosome). These studies cannot significantly distinguish between Danish, Frisian and German (Schleswig-Holstein) Y chromosomes although the Frisians were slightly closer to the indigenous samples. Areas with the highest concentration of Germanic (Danish-Viking/Anglo-Saxon) Y chromosomes occurred in areas associated with the Danelaw and Danish-Viking settlement, especially York and Norfolk. In these areas, about 60% of Y chromosomes are of Germanic origin.

This indicates an exclusively male component. The extent of Danish/Anglo-Saxon contribution to the entire gene pool of these areas is also dependent on the migration of women. For example, if it is assumed that few or no Germanic women settled in these areas, then the Germanic contribution to the gene pool is halved to 30%, and in turn if greater numbers of women did settle, the contribution could be even higher than 60%.

Current estimates on the initial contribution of Anglo-Saxon migrants range from less than 10,000 to as many as 200,000, although some recent Y-chromosome studies posit a considerably large continental (Germanic) contribution to the current English gene pool (50–100%). A recent study by a team from the Department of Biology at University College London based on computer simulations indicate that an apartheid-like social structure in early Anglo-Saxon England provides a plausible explanation for a high-degree of continental male-line ancestry in England.

Mitochondrial DNA analysis

This indicates that a majority of maternal lines in the population go back to the Palaeolithic and Mesolithic periods. The lines tend to be similar in all parts of Britain, though with Norse input in the Northern and Western Isles of Scotland. The source of many of the other lines is thought to be the Iberian Peninsula, but there has been some input from the Germanic areas into the east coast of England.

References

History of immigration to the United Kingdom